Anthropometric cosmetology (Anthropometry from Greek Ανθρωπος, "man") is the medical practice to correct or modify deformities in the upper and lower extremities of the body. This is done in order to attain an aesthetically pleasing appearance or to eliminate physical and psychological discomforts.

History
Anthropometric (orthopedic) cosmetology appeared in the 1990s based on traumatology, orthopedic, and aesthetic surgery. In 1965, Gavriil Ilizarov determined that bone fragments could be carefully pulled apart without disrupting their alignment. These bone fragments could then grow back to a complete form. This discovery was groundbreaking for the fields of traumatology orthopedics. In complex cases of comminuted fractures, the Ilizarov apparatus method makes it possible to avoid squeezing the remnant fragments together, which otherwise might result in shortened limbs. Traumatic injuries, as well as congenital and acquired deformities, may be treated with this technique.

Chondrodysplasia is a disease where a child's growth stops abruptly, resulting in an adult dwarf, with shortened and often deformed arms and legs and is regarded as a congenital deformity. Ilizarov began to solve the problems associated with such diseases using his own apparatus. The apparatus he initially used was modified to support the lengthening of finger (phalanx) bones. The first experiments involved stretching the bones in the arms and legs of people with chondrodysplasia. New techniques, involving artificial fractures, have been developed.

Ilizarov's followers, Kaplunov and Yegorov, first used anthropometric cosmetology in Volgograd, Russia in 1992, on a healthy patient for strictly cosmetic purposes. The surgical operation was a success: the tibia was lengthened 6 cm over 11 months. Later, this technique was used elsewhere. Yegorov, Chernov, and Nekrasov subsequently wrote a book Orthopedic Cosmetology, the first scientific publication in this field.

Surgical intervention: 
 Operations for leg lengthening and other cosmetic corrections are recommended professionally for patients who are at least 17 years in age, after the complete growth zone closure occurs in the organism's body, thus minimizing future growth related problems.
Anthropometric cosmetology can be used when the patient has:
 X-shaped curvature of the legs
 O-shaped curvature of the legs
 Relative shortening of the legs relative to body length
 Psychological problems related to lack of body height.
Types of anthropometric cosmetology:
 Anthropometric correction for tibia or femurs extension in a patient.
 Anthropometric distraction for tibia or femurs lengthening in a patient.
 Simultaneous distraction and correction in the process of changing the form of the patient's legs.

The period of rehabilitation
In anthropometric correction (extension), the alignment of the legs takes about 17 days after the initial operation, followed by a period of bone fixation during which time the patient wears the apparatus continuously until advised otherwise. Depending on the patient's abilities, this may take 45–65 days. After removal of the apparatus, the patient should avoid extensive loads on their legs as well as wearing high heeled shoes for about two months. Legs take the final form 7–8 months after the operation. In anthropometric distraction (lengthening) the process may continue depending on the length desired. The legs may be lengthened at most one millimeter per day. At present, the average period of lengthening in patients takes 3–6 months. The whole process may take 7–9 months. About three months after the removal of apparatus, a patient may feel great discomfort which is usually eliminated through therapeutic and physical exercises like physiotherapy or anaerobic activities such as swimming.

Complications after anthropometric cosmetology include:
 Soft tissue inflammation (sharp pains around the pin-skin contact area accompanied by mild red swollen appearance) around the pins of the Ilizarov apparatus. This is not dangerous if treated. If drugs are not effective, the pins may be easily replaced.
 Slow bone regeneration. This is particularly common in patients who smoke intensively during the lengthening process.
 Appearance of contracture of knee and talocrural joints. These are treated by intensive medical gymnastics before and after the removal of the apparatuses.
 Dissatisfaction with the anthropometric correction. Generally the result depends on the performing surgeon's experience and abilities.

See also

References

Bibliography
 1.	Yegorov M.F., Chernov A.P., Nekrasov M.S. “Orthopedic cosmetology” Publishing center “Fedorov” 2000.
 2.	Solomin L.N. “Bases of osteosynthesis per bone with Ilizarov Apparatus”, publishing office ELBI-Spb, 2005
 3.	Goldreyer M.M. “Short novels about anthropometric cosmetology. Life after the victory” publishing office “Sound book” Moscow 2009.

Cosmetic surgery
Russian inventions